John Jewkes may refer to:

John Jewkes (MP) (1683–1743), English Member of Parliament for Aldborough
John Jewkes (economist) (1902–1988), English classical liberal economist